The 1988 Refuge Assurance Cup was the first competing of the Refuge Assurance Cup, for the most successful teams in the Sunday League. It was an English limited overs county cricket tournament which was held between 7 and 18 September 1988. The tournament was won by Lancashire County Cricket Club who defeated Worcestershire County Cricket Club by 52 runs in the final at Edgbaston, Birmingham.

Format
The cup was an end-of-season affair. The counties finishing in the top four of the 1988 Refuge Assurance League competed in the semi-finals. The top two teams were drawn at home. Winners from the semi-finals then went on to the final at Edgbaston which was held on 18 September 1988.

The cup was played using an orange ball.

Semi-finals

Final

The attendance at the final was 14,616.

References

CricketArchive tournament page 

Pro40
Refuge